
The Royal Order of Ismail (Nishan al-Ismail) was an order of chivalry and state honour in the Kingdom of Egypt.

History
It was established on 14 April 1915 by Sultan Hussein Kamel of Egypt to reward eminent services to the state. The order was named after Ismail Pasha and could be awarded to both Egyptian nationals and foreigners. It was awarded in four classes:
 Grand Cordon of the Order of Ismail (limited to thirty recipients)
 Grand Officer of the Order of Ismail (limited to seventy five recipients)
 Commander of the Order of Ismail (limited to one hundred and fifty recipients)
 Officer of the Order of Ismail (limited to three hundred recipients)
 Chevalier (knight) of the Order of Ismail 

The Order became obsolete following the establishment of the Republic of Egypt in 1953.

Recipients 
 Quintin Brand
 Dwight D. Eisenhower
 Alexander Granville
 Michael Hansson
 Muhammad Hasan
 Kigeli V of Rwanda
 Hussein Refki Pasha
 Owana Salazar
 Ahmed Ali Pasha

References

External links
 

Ismail, Order of
Ismail, Order of
Awards established in 1915
1915 establishments in Egypt